Oncopsis flavicollis is a species of leafhoppers belonging to the family Cicadellidae subfamily Eurymelinae.

Description
It is a sexual dimorph species. Males show dark markings on the face with round spots. Females are very variable, with different colour forms. Usually they are bright-yellow on the upper part of the face, on the forebody and on the base of the wings, while the remaining part of the wings are chestnut brown. Adult can be found in forest environment from May to September. These leafhoppers feeds on birch (Betula pendula and Betula pubescens).

Distribution
This species can be found in most of Europe, in the Near East, in North Africa and in the eastern Palearctic realm.

References 

 M. F. Claridge and W. J. Reynolds Male courtship songs and sibling species in the Oncopsis flavicollis species group (Hemiptera: Cicadellidae)

Hemiptera of Europe
Insects of North Africa
Insects described in 1761
Taxa named by Carl Linnaeus
Eurymelinae